In copyright law, the legal status of hyperlinking (also termed "linking") and that of framing concern how courts address two different but related Web technologies. In large part, the legal issues concern use of these technologies to create or facilitate public access to proprietary media content — such as portions of commercial websites. When hyperlinking and framing have the effect of distributing, and creating routes for the distribution of content (information) that does not come from the proprietors of the Web pages affected by these practices, the proprietors often seek the aid of courts to suppress the conduct, particularly when the effect of the conduct is to disrupt or circumvent the proprietors' mechanisms for receiving financial compensation.

The issues about linking and framing have become so intertwined under copyright law that it is impractical to attempt to address them separately. As will appear, some decisions confuse them with one another, while other decisions involve and therefore address both. Framing involves the use of hyperlinking, so that any challenge of framing under copyright law is likely to involve a challenge of hyperlinking as well.

Linking
While hyperlinking occurs in other technologies, U.S. copyright litigation has centered on HTML. Accordingly, this article considers only such technology.

Ordinary link
The HTML code for a simple, ordinary hyperlink is shown below.

A home page link would be written this way:
<a href="https://www.uspto.gov/">USPTO</a>

Deep link
Most websites are organized hierarchically, with a home page at the top and deeper pages within the site, reached by links on the home page. Deep linking is the practice of using a hyperlink that takes a user directly to a page other than the top or home page. The link given below is a deep link. 
<a href="https://www.uspto.gov/patents-getting-started/general-information-concerning-patents">General information concerning patents</a>

A typical Internet browser would render the foregoing HTML code as:

When a user clicks on the underlined text, the browser jumps from the page on which the link is shown to a page of the website of the U.S. Patent and Trademark Office (USPTO) that has the URL (Web address) shown above: Patent basics.

Several lawsuits have involved complaints by proprietors of Web pages against the use of deep links.

Inline link
Related issues arise from use of inline links (also called image-source or img-src links because the HTML code begins with "img src=") on Web pages. An inline link places material — usually an image such as a JPEG or GIF — from a distant website into the Web page being viewed. For example, the adjacent image is the seal of the USPTO, as shown on some of its pages at the USPTO website. The former of these becomes an inline or img-src link if img src= is inserted before the http, angle brackets enclose the whole expression, and the entire code fragment is inserted into the text of a page of HTML code.

When an inline (img-src) link of an image is used on a Web page, it seems to be present as a part of the Web page. The presence of the image is only virtual, however, in the sense that the image file is not physically present at the server for the website being viewed. The actual location of the image file, if the image were that of the USPTO seal, would be at the USPTO server in Virginia. Use of inline linking has led to contentious litigation (discussed below).

Hierarchy of links

The image at right is a front view of the U.S. Supreme Court (SCOTUS). It can be found on the SCOTUS website as an element in the headings for various pages of that site The image can also be found in isolation All these files are stored on the SCOTUS server and can be accessed by clicking on the respective hyperlinks (deep links).

Image links can be categorized in a hierarchy, based on the technological expedient used to effectuate the link, as explained below. Each further step corresponds to successively lower levels of risk of copyright infringement. The hierarchy operates as follows, using the picture of the SCOTUS building as an example for discussion purposes (selected because it is in the public domain and is not subject to copyright protection; 17 U.S.C. § 105 provides that copyright protection is not available for any work of the United States Government). An image may be placed on a Web page or made available for viewing by any of the following expedients:
Copying the image file to the server hosting the page (as that of the Supreme Court has been copied to the Wikipedia server to present the image at the upper right of this section of text). Unless the image is in the public domain, that copying will create copyright infringement liability unless a defense, such as fair use or license, applies. The HTML code for embedding such an image in text is the ordinary form for an image in text (where the PNG file is in same directory as the text): 
Using an img-src link to the image at the proprietor's Web page, to make the page appear to contain the image.   In an ordinary context, the page's creator would place text around the image, making the image appear as it does at the immediate right. The image from an img-src link looks like the image from a file copied to the page's server, even though the image (i.e., its code) is actually stored on the remote server of the other Website and not on the page's own server. The U.S. Court of Appeals for the Ninth Circuit considered this fact of crucial significance in the Perfect 10 case, discussed subsequently in this article. The court held that, when Google provided links to images, Google did not violate the provisions of the copyright law prohibiting unauthorized reproduction and distribution of copies of a work: "Because Google's computers do not store the photographic images, Google does not have a copy of the images for purposes of the Copyright Act." (This fact about image storage is also true of all links that follow in this list.)

This expedient has been challenged as copyright infringement. See the Arriba Soft and Perfect 10 cases (below). In the Perfect 10 case, Perfect 10 argued that Google's image pages caused viewers to believe they were seeing the images on Google's website. The court brushed this argument aside: "While in-line linking and framing may cause some computer users to believe they are viewing a single Google Web page, the Copyright Act, unlike the Trademark Act, does not protect a copyright holder against acts that cause consumer confusion."

Using an ordinary (deep) hyperlink to the image at the remote server, so that users must click on a link on the hosting page to jump to the image. The HTML code would be https://www.supremecourt.gov/images/sectionbanner13.png. This has been protested because it bypasses everything at the other site but the image. Such protests have been largely ineffective. This argument on Kelly's behalf is articulated in the amicus curiae brief supporting Kelly by the American Society of Media Photographers:[I]t was the actual display of the full-size images of Kelly’s work stripped from the original context that was not fair use. Merely linking to Kelly's originating home page, on the other hand, without free-standing display of the full-size images, would not run afoul of the fair use limits established by the Panel. It is striking that nowhere in [the adversaries'] briefs do they explain why linking could not be constructed in this fashion.
Using a deep link to the specific page on the image proprietor's website at which the image is located, thus presenting the image to the user along with the textual material with which the proprietor surrounded it (but avoiding the portal or home page). The HTML code is https://www.supremecourt.gov/about/biographies.aspx for Biographies of Current Justices of the Supreme Court. This has been protested because it does not require the viewer to look at the advertising or other material at the home and other earlier pages on the proprietor's site, although the user must look at what is on the same page as the image. Such protests have been largely ineffective.
Linking to the home page of the image proprietor's website and explaining how to page down through his successive pages and all of his extraneous material to find the image. For example: https://www.supremecourt.gov/default.aspx. This will not create copyright infringement liability under any theory thus far advanced in U.S. litigation.

Framing
Framing is the juxtaposition of two separate Web pages within the same page, usually with a separate frame with navigational elements. Framing is a method of presentation in a Web page that breaks the screen up into multiple non-overlapping windows. Each window contains a display from a separate HTML file, for example, a Web page from a different website that is fetched by automatically hyperlinking to it. While the usage of frames as a common Web design element has been deprecated for several years (replaced by the usage of <div> elements), some sites, like Google Images and Google Translate, use frames as a way to help navigate non-Google pages from a framed Google interface.

Incorporating copyrighted Web content by usage of framing has led to contentious litigation. Frames can be used for Web pages belonging to the original site or to load pages from other sites into a customized arrangement of frames that provide a generalized interface without actually requiring the viewer to browse the linked site from that site's URLs and interfaces.

Proprietors of copyrighted content have at times contended that framing their Web pages constituted copyright infringement. Copyright provides exclusive rights to reproduce ((1)) or distribute ((3)) copies of the work. However, framing does not directly reproduce or distribute any copy of the original Web page. Rather, the accused infringer simply establishes a pointer that the user's browser follows to the proprietor's server and Web page.

History of copyright litigation in field
In large part, linking and framing are not held to be copyright infringement under U.S. and German copyright law, even though the underlying Web pages are protected under copyright law. Because the copyright-protected content is stored on a server other than that of the linking or framing person (it is stored on the plaintiff's server), there is typically no infringing "copy" made by the defendant linking or framing person (as may be essential) on which to base liability. Some European countries take a more protective view, however, and hold unauthorized framing and so-called deep linking unlawful.

European Union

The European Court of Justice's binding ruling in 2014 was that embedding a work could not be a violation of copyright:

In September 2016, the European Court of Justice ruled that knowingly linking to an unauthorized posting of a copyrighted work for commercial gain constituted infringement of the exclusive right to communicate the work to the public. The case surrounded GeenStijl and Sanoma; in 2011, photos were leaked from an upcoming issue of the Dutch version of Playboy (published by Sanoma) and hosted on a website known as FileFactory. GeenStijl covered the leak by displaying a thumbnail of one of the images and linking to the remainder of the unauthorized copies. The court ruled in favor of Sanoma, arguing that GeenStijl's authors knowingly reproduced and communicated a copyrighted work to the public without consent of its author, and that GeenStijl had profited from the unauthorized publication.

Belgium

Belgian Association of Newspaper Editors v. Google
In September 2006 the Belgian Association of Newspaper Editors sued Google and obtained an injunctive order from the Belgian Court of First Instance that Google must stop deep linking to Belgian newspapers without paying royalties, or else pay a fine of €1 million daily. Many newspaper columns were critical of the Belgian newspapers' position.

Denmark

Danish Newspaper Publishers Association v. Newsbooster
The Bailiff's Court of Copenhagen ruled in July 2002 against the Danish Website Newsbooster, holding, in a suit brought by the Danish Newspaper Publishers Association (DNPA), that Newsbooster had violated Danish copyright law by deep linking to newspaper articles on Danish newspapers' Internet sites.  Newsbooster's service allows users to enter keywords to search for news stories, and then deep links to the stories are provided. The DNPA said that this conduct was "tantamount to theft." The court ruled in favor of the DNPA, not because of the mere act of linking but because Newsbooster used the links to gain commercial advantage over the DNPA, which was unlawful under the Danish Marketing Act. The court enjoined Newsbooster's service.

home A/S v. Ofir A-S
The Maritime and Commercial Court in Copenhagen took a somewhat different view in 2005 in a suit that home A/S, a real estate chain, brought against Ofir A-S, an Internet portal (OFiR), which maintains an Internet search engine. home A/S maintains an Internet website that has a searchable database of its current realty listings. Ofir copied some database information, which the court held unprotected under Danish law, and also Ofir's search engine provided deep links to the advertisements for individual properties that home A/S listed, thus by-passing the home page and search engine of home A/S. The court held that the deep linking did not create infringement liability. The Court found that search engines are desirable as well as necessary to the function of the Internet; that it is usual that search engines provide deep links; and that businesses that offer their services on the Internet must expect that deep links will be provided to their websites. Ofir's site did not use banner advertising and its search engine allowed users, if they so chose, to go to a home page rather than directly to the advertisement of an individual property. The opinion does not appear to distinguish or explain away the difference in result from that of the Newsbooster case.

Germany

Holtzbrinck v. Paperboy
In July 2003 a German Federal Superior Court held that the Paperboy search engine could lawfully deep link to news stories. An appellate court then overturned the ruling, but the German Federal Supreme Court reversed in favor of Paperboy. "A sensible use of the immense wealth of information offered by the World Wide Web is practically impossible without drawing on the search engines and their hyperlink services (especially deep links)," the German court said.

Decision I-20 U 42/11 Dusseldorf Court of Appeal 8 October 2011
In Germany making content available to the public on a Website by embedding the content with inline links now appears to be copyright infringement. This applies even though a copy has never been taken and kept of an image and even though the image is never "physically" part of the website. The Düsseldorf appeal court overruled the lower Court of First Instance in this case. The Defendant had included links on his blog to two photographs that appeared on the Claimant’s website. No prior permission had been sought or obtained.

Scotland

Shetland Times Ltd. v. Wills
The first suit of prominence in the field was Shetland Times Ltd. v. Wills, Scot. Ct. of Session (Edinburgh, 24 Oct 1996). The Shetland Times challenged use by Wills of deep linking to pages of the newspaper on which selected articles of interest appeared. The objection was that defendant Wills thus by-passed the front and intervening pages on which advertising and other material appeared in which the plaintiff had an interest but defendant did not. The Times obtained an interim interdict (Scottish for preliminary injunction) and the case then settled.

United States

Washington Post v. Total News
In February 1997 the Washington Post, CNN, the Los Angeles Times, Dow Jones (Wall Street Journal), and Reuters sued Total News Inc. for framing their news stories on the Total News Web page.  The case was settled in June 1997, on the basis that linking without framing would be used in the future.

Ticketmaster v. Microsoft
In April 1997 Ticketmaster sued Microsoft in Los Angeles federal district court for deep linking. Ticketmaster objected to Microsoft's bypassing the home and intermediate pages on Ticketmaster's site, claiming that Microsoft had "pilfered" its content and diluted its value. Microsoft's Answer raised a number of defenses explained in detail in its pleadings, including implied license, contributory negligence, and voluntary assumption of the risk. Microsoft also argued that Ticketmaster had breached an unwritten Internet code, under which any website operator has the right to link to anyone else's site. A number of articles in the trade press derided Ticketmaster's suit. The case was settled in February 1999, on confidential terms; Microsoft stopped the deep linking and instead used a link to Ticketmaster's home page.

A later case, Ticketmaster Corp. v. Tickets.com, Inc. (2000), yielded a ruling in favour of deep linking.

Kelly v. Arriba Soft
The first important U.S. decision in this field was that of the Ninth Circuit in Kelly v. Arriba Soft Corp. Kelly complained, among other things, that Arriba's search engine used thumbnails to deep link to images on his Web page. The court found that Arriba's use was highly transformative, in that it made available to Internet users a functionality not previously available, and that was not otherwise readily provided — an improved way to search for images (by using visual cues instead of verbal cues). This factor, combined with the relatively slight economic harm to Kelly, tipped the fair use balance decisively in Arriba's favour.

As in other cases, Kelly objected to linking because it caused users to bypass his home page and intervening pages. He was unable, however, to show substantial economic harm. Kelly argued largely that the part of the copyright statute violated was the public display right ((5)). He was aware of the difficulties under the reproduction and distribution provisions (17 U.S.C. §§ 106(1) and (3)), which require proof that the accused infringer trafficked in copies of the protected work. The court focused on the fair use defense, however, under which it ruled in Arriba's favour.

Perfect 10 v. Amazon
In Perfect 10, Inc. v. Amazon.com, Inc., the Ninth Circuit again considered whether an image search engine's use of thumbnail was a fair use. Although the facts were somewhat closer than in the Arriba Soft case, the court nonetheless found the accused infringer's use fair because it was "highly transformative." The court explained:

We conclude that the significantly transformative nature of Google's search engine, particularly in light of its public benefit, outweighs Google's superseding and commercial uses of the thumbnails in this case. … We are also mindful of the Supreme Court's direction that "the more transformative the new work, the less will be the significance of other factors, like commercialism, that may weigh against a finding of fair use."

In addition, the court specifically addressed the copyright status of linking, in the first U.S. appellate decision to do so:

Google does not … display a copy of full-size infringing photographic images for purposes of the Copyright Act when Google frames in-line linked images that appear on a user's computer screen. Because Google's computers do not store the photographic images, Google does not have a copy of the images for purposes of the Copyright Act. In other words, Google does not have any "material objects … in which a work is fixed … and from which the work can be perceived, reproduced, or otherwise communicated" and thus cannot communicate a copy. Instead of communicating a copy of the image, Google provides HTML instructions that direct a user's browser to a website publisher's computer that stores the full-size photographic image. Providing these HTML instructions is not equivalent to showing a copy. First, the HTML instructions are lines of text, not a photographic image. Second, HTML instructions do not themselves cause infringing images to appear on the user's computer screen. The HTML merely gives the address of the image to the user's browser. The browser then interacts with the computer that stores the infringing image. It is this interaction that causes an infringing image to appear on the user's computer screen. Google may facilitate the user's access to infringing images. However, such assistance raised only contributory liability issues and does not constitute direct infringement of the copyright owner's display rights. … While in-line linking and framing may cause some computer users to believe they are viewing a single Google Web page, the Copyright Act, unlike the Trademark Act, does not protect a copyright holder against acts that cause consumer confusion.

State of U.S. law after Arriba Soft and Perfect 10
The Arriba Soft case stood for the proposition that deep linking and actual reproduction in reduced-size copies (or preparation of reduced-size derivative works) were both excusable as fair use because the defendant's use of the work did not actually or potentially divert trade in the marketplace from the first work; and also it provided the public with a previously unavailable, very useful function of the kind that copyright law exists to promote (finding desired information on the Web). The Perfect 10 case involved similar considerations, but more of a balancing of interests was involved. The conduct was excused because the value to the public of the otherwise unavailable, useful function outweighed the impact on Perfect 10 of Google's possibly superseding use.

Moreover, in Perfect 10, the court laid down a far-reaching precedent in favour of linking and framing, which the court gave a complete pass under copyright. It concluded that "in-line linking and framing may cause some computer users to believe they are viewing a single Google Web page, [but] the Copyright Act . . . does not protect a copyright holder against acts that cause consumer confusion."

A February 2018 summary judgement from the District Court for the Southern District of New York created a new challenge to the established cases. In Goldman v. Breitbart, Justin Goldman, a photographer, posted his on-the-street photograph of Tom Brady with Boston Celtics GM Danny Ainge and others to Snapchat, which became popular over social media such as Twitter on rumors that Brady was helping with the Celtics' recruitment. Several news organizations subsequently published stories embedding the tweets with Goldman's photograph in the stories. Goldman took legal action against nine of these news agencies, claiming they violated his copyright. Judge Katherine Forrest decided in favour of Goldman and asserting the news sites violated his copyright, rejecting elements of the Perfect 10 ruling. Forrest said that as the news agencies had to take specific steps to embed the tweets with the photograph in their stories, wrote the stories to highlight those, and otherwise was not providing an automated service like Google's search engine.

References

Computer law
Copyright law
Hypertext